Federico Matías León (born 30 October 1984 in Resistencia, Argentina) is an Argentine footballer currently playing for Barracas Central.

Career

Club
León started his career with Boca Juniors and made one appearance for the club before going to join Spanish side Elche's reserve team. He failed to make a league appearance for them before making the move to Málaga's reserve team, Malaga B, but again didn't make an appearance. After two years away, León returned to Argentina in 2007 to join Almirante Brown. He participated in 36 matches for Almirante Brown before leaving to sign for Ferro Carril Oeste but, after 13 games for Ferro, he returned to Almirante Brown a year after departing; via a short stint with Tristán Suárez. León and Almirante Brown won promotion into the Primera B Nacional for 2010–11 after winning the Primera B Metropolitana. 62 appearances and 2 goals followed in the Primera B Nacional for him before he left in 2012 and subsequently joined Primera División of Chile side Deportes Iquique. He scored once in 23 league games for the Chilean side. In July 2013, León signed for Aldosivi.

Career statistics

Club
.

Honours

Club
Almirante Brown
 Primera B Metropolitana (1): 2009–10

References

External links
 
 

1984 births
Living people
People from Resistencia, Chaco
Argentine footballers
Association football defenders
Argentine expatriate footballers
Aldosivi footballers
Boca Juniors footballers
Club Almirante Brown footballers
Ferro Carril Oeste footballers
CSyD Tristán Suárez footballers
Deportes Iquique footballers
Chilean Primera División players
Argentine Primera División players
Expatriate footballers in Chile
Expatriate footballers in Spain
Atlético Malagueño players
Elche CF Ilicitano footballers
Sportspeople from Chaco Province